Gergő Szécsi (born 7 February 1989) is a Hungarian footballer who plays for Ferencváros.

Club career
On 18 November 2017, he was signed by Nemzeti Bajnokság I club Balmazújvárosi FC.

In June 2019, Gergő signed to Ferencvaros as their 3rd goalkeeper.

Club statistics

Updated to games played as of 15 May 2022.

References

External links

1989 births
Living people
Sportspeople from Eger
Hungarian footballers
Association football goalkeepers
Debreceni VSC players
Létavértes SC players
Békéscsaba 1912 Előre footballers
Balmazújvárosi FC players
Kisvárda FC players
Ferencvárosi TC footballers
Soroksár SC players
Nemzeti Bajnokság I players
Nemzeti Bajnokság II players
Nemzeti Bajnokság III players